The Mildren name was used on a series of racing vehicles constructed for, or acquired by, Australian racing team owner Alec Mildren during the 1960s and early 1970s.

Mildren Maserati
The Mildren Maserati was a one-off sports car which was built in 1964, utilizing a clone of a Lotus 19 chassis with components from a Cooper T51 and a 2.9 litre Maserati Type 61 engine. The chassis was constructed by Bob Britton, who also produced racing cars under the Rennmax name. The car was driven to victory in the 1965 Victorian Sports Car Championship by  Kevin Bartlett. It was also favoured to win the 1965 Australian Tourist Trophy in the hands of Frank Gardner, but it failed to start the race after an engine failure in a preliminary heat.

The Mildren Maserati was sold to Tasmanian Ross Ambrose in 1966 and was subsequently fitted with a 2.2-litre Coventry Climax engine and raced as the Rennmax-Climax. In 1969 Ambrose had the car re-engined with a 4.4 litre Traco-Oldsmobile powerplant and then race it as the Traco-Rennmax.

Mildren Waggott (Rennmax BN3)

The Mildren Waggott was a space frame open wheeler racing car built by Bob Britton for Alec Mildren Racing, as one of a number of cars built to the Rennmax BN3 design, which itself was derived from the Brabham BT23.  Originally powered by a 1.6 litre Alfa Romeo engine, the car was driven by Max Stewart in the 1969 Tasman Series and was subsequently fitted with a 1.6 litre Waggott. Stewart drove the car to victory in the 1969 Australian Formula 2 Championship, the 1970 Australian Formula 2 Championship and the 1971 Australian Drivers' Championship, with a 2.0 litre Waggott engine being used to win the third title. Stewart also won the 1972 Singapore Grand Prix with the car which was Ford powered for this race.

Mildren Mono
The Mildren Mono was a monocoque open wheeler racing car which was designed by Len Bailey and built by Alan Mann Racing. The car debuted in 1968 at Warwick Farm Raceway in the hands of Frank Gardner, powered by a 2.5 litre Alfa Romeo V8 engine. Kevin Bartlett drove the car to victory in the 1969 Australian Drivers' Championship utilizing the Alfa Romeo engine and 4 cylinder, four valve per cylinder Waggott engines of 1850cc and 2 litre capacity.

The Mono was later raced as a Ford powered Australian Formula 2 car by Ray Winter, finishing third in the rain-affected 1975 Australian Grand Prix at Surfers Paradise against a field composed primarily of "Formula 5000" cars.

The car was commonly referred to as the "Yellow Submarine", due to the Mildren team cars generally being painted yellow.

Mildren Chevrolet
The Mildren Chevrolet was a Chevrolet powered monocoque Formula 5000 racing car, designed by Len Bailey with assistance from Frank Gardner. The car was driven by Kevin Bartlett in the 1970 Australian Grand Prix, but failed to finish. It was also driven by Bartlett in the 1971 Tasman Series, with Bartlett placing seventh in that series.

References

Australian racecar constructors